The by-election in Warwick and Leamington, in Warwickshire, England, occurred on 28 March 1968, after the death of the Conservative MP Sir John Hobson  and resulted in a hold for the Conservatives.

Results

References

1968 elections in the United Kingdom
1968 in England
20th century in Warwickshire
Warwick
Leamington Spa
By-elections to the Parliament of the United Kingdom in Warwickshire constituencies